Let the Corpses Tan is a 2017 neo-Western crime film directed and written by Hélène Cattet and Bruno Forzani. The film is based on the novel Laissez bronzer les cadavres by Jean-Patrick Manchette and Jean-Pierre Bastid. The film involves a gang of thieves who obtain 250 kg of stolen gold who arrive at the home of an artist who is caught in a love triangle. The scenario quickly escalates into a day long gun fight between police and robbers.

Let the Corpses Tan received eight nominations at the 9th Magritte Awards, including Best Film and Best Director for Cattet and Forzani, winning three.

Cast

 Elina Löwensohn as Luce
 Stéphane Ferrara as Rhino, the leader of the gang
 Bernie Bonvoisin as the brute
 Marc Barbé as Max Bernier
 Michelangelo Marchese as the lawyer
 Pierre Nisse as the young man
 Marine Sainsily as Rose
 Hervé Sogne as policeman
 Marilyn Jess as policewoman
 Dorylia Calmel as Mélanie, Bernier's wife
 Aline Stevens as the golden woman

Production
Let the Corpses Tan was predominantly shot in Corsica.

Release
Let the Corpses Tan premiered at the Locarno Film Festival on 4 August 2017.

The film received its North American Premiere at the Midnight Madness screening at the Toronto International Film Festival in 2017. It was released in France on 2017 October 18 and in Belgium on 10 January 2018 by Anonymes Films.

Reception

Critical response
On Rotten Tomatoes, the film has an approval rating of 76%, based on 71 reviews with an average rating of 6.57/10. On Metacritic it has a score of 62% based on reviews from 17 critics, indicating "generally favorable reviews".

Neil Young of The Hollywood Reporter referred to the film as "borderline incoherent" stating that after all the double and triple crosses in the film, it was nearly impossible to follow without knowledge of the source material. Allan Hunter of Screen Daily shared similar ideas, opining that the film had "style to burn" and that it was a "a film of almost delirious excess" and that noted that if it mattered if the audience doesn't care for any of the characters, finding it a "intoxicating aspect of watching a team so in single-minded and in control of their filmmaking technique. After a while, though, it does start to ring hollow."

Box office

Let the Corpses Tan grossed $93,409 at the box office.

Accolades

References

External links
 

2017 films
Belgian crime films
French Western (genre) films
2017 Western (genre) films
Neo-Western films
2010s French-language films
French-language Belgian films
2010s French films